Lúcio Flávio dos Santos (born  3 February 1979), known as Lúcio Flávio, is a Brazilian football manager and former player who played as an attacking midfielder. He is the current assistant manager of Botafogo.

Playing career
Born in Curitiba, Paraná, Lúcio Flávio was a Paraná Clube youth graduate. He made his first team debut during the 1997 season, and subsequently became an important unit as the side finished second in the 1999 Copa Sul-Minas.

On 26 July 1999, after renewing his contract, Lúcio Flávio moved on loan to Internacional until the end of the year. After playing rarely, he returned to his parent club ahead of the 2000 season, and lifted the Copa João Havelange Group Yellow in the campaign.

Lúcio Flávio moved to São Paulo for the 2002 season, but failed to impress and joined Coritiba on 17 July 2002. In 2003, still owned by Paraná, he represented Atlético Mineiro.

In January 2004, Lúcio Flávio terminated his contract with Paraná due to unpaid wages, and agreed to a one-year deal with São Caetano. In 2005, he spent six months abroad on loan at Saudi Arabia's Al-Ahli FC, before joining Botafogo also in a temporary deal on 13 December of that year.

After agreeing to a permanent deal with Bota for the 2007 campaign, Lúcio Flávio was a regular starter for the club before signing a two-year contract with Santos on 18 December 2008. After failing to adapt, he returned to his previous club in May 2009, being again a first-choice before joining Liga MX side Atlas on 7 December 2010.

Transfer listed by the Mexican side in June 2011, Lúcio Flávio returned to Brazil in the following month, after signing for Vitória. He left the latter roughly one year later, and returned to his first club Paraná.

Lúcio Flávio left Paraná in June 2015, after the expiry of his contract, and moved to another club he already represented, Coritiba. In the following two seasons, he played for ABC and Joinville, retiring with the latter in 2017 at the age of 38.

Post-playing career
After retiring, Lúcio Flávio worked briefly as a sports commentator before returning to his first club Paraná in October 2018, as an assistant coach. He was also an interim for one match during the 2020 Campeonato Paranaense, as manager Allan Aal was suspended.

On 20 October 2020, Lúcio Flávio returned to Botafogo, as an assistant coach of Bruno Lazaroni. The following 6 February, after the dismissal of Eduardo Barroca, he was named interim manager for the remainder of the 2020 Campeonato Brasileiro Série A, with the club already relegated.

Managerial statistics

Honours

Player
Paraná
Campeonato Brasileiro Série B: 2000

São Caetano
Campeonato Paulista: 2004

Botafogo
Campeonato Carioca: 2006, 2010
Taça Guanabara: 2006, 2010
Taça Rio: 2007, 2008, 2010

ABC
Campeonato Potiguar: 2016

References

External links

1979 births
Living people
Footballers from Curitiba
Brazilian footballers
Association football midfielders
Campeonato Brasileiro Série A players
Campeonato Brasileiro Série B players
Campeonato Brasileiro Série C players
Liga MX players
Saudi Professional League players
Paraná Clube players
Sport Club Internacional players
São Paulo FC players
Coritiba Foot Ball Club players
Clube Atlético Mineiro players
Associação Desportiva São Caetano players
Al-Ahli Saudi FC players
Botafogo de Futebol e Regatas players
Santos FC players
Atlas F.C. footballers
Esporte Clube Vitória players
ABC Futebol Clube players
Joinville Esporte Clube players
Brazilian expatriate footballers
Brazilian expatriate sportspeople in Mexico
Brazilian expatriate sportspeople in Saudi Arabia
Expatriate footballers in Mexico
Expatriate footballers in Saudi Arabia
Brazilian football managers
Botafogo de Futebol e Regatas managers